Laingholm is a small community situated in the Waitākere Ranges of West Auckland, New Zealand.

The name is derived from George and John Laing, who farmed the area starting in 1854, before it was subdivided. Celebrations were held in 2003 for the 150th anniversary of European settlement.

Laingholm is located on the shores of the Manukau Harbour and within the Waitākere Ranges.

Geography

Coastal Laingholm is dominated by pōhutukawa/rata sheltered coastal fringe forest, while inland areas are predominantly a warm lowlands pūriri forest. The West Coast kōwhai grows abundantly on the steep slopes of the Laingholm area.

History

Pioneer farmer George Laing bought 610 acres of land in the mid-19th century, farming the valley and living with his family at the Roseneath farmhouse. The area became known as Laingholm, and the Laing family continued to farm the area until 1921. Lainghold and the greater area developed as farmland in the 1860s, with communities using the dock at Little Muddy Creek as their main access to the outside world, until road access became possible in 1914.

Demographics

Laingholm had a population of 2,385 at the 2018 New Zealand census, an increase of 120 people (5.3%) since the 2013 census, and an increase of 51 people (2.2%) since the 2006 census. There were 843 households, comprising 1,188 males and 1,200 females, giving a sex ratio of 0.99 males per female. The median age was 40.2 years (compared with 37.4 years nationally), with 555 people (23.3%) aged under 15 years, 345 (14.5%) aged 15 to 29, 1,266 (53.1%) aged 30 to 64, and 219 (9.2%) aged 65 or older.

Ethnicities were 93.1% European/Pākehā, 9.9% Māori, 2.5% Pacific peoples, 4.5% Asian, and 2.6% other ethnicities. People may identify with more than one ethnicity.

The percentage of people born overseas was 27.7, compared with 27.1% nationally.

Although some people chose not to answer the census's question about religious affiliation, 66.2% had no religion, 23.4% were Christian, 0.3% had Māori religious beliefs, 0.6% were Hindu, 0.1% were Muslim, 0.6% were Buddhist and 3.0% had other religions.

Of those at least 15 years old, 606 (33.1%) people had a bachelor's or higher degree, and 180 (9.8%) people had no formal qualifications. The median income was $47,100, compared with $31,800 nationally. 540 people (29.5%) earned over $70,000 compared to 17.2% nationally. The employment status of those at least 15 was that 1,068 (58.4%) people were employed full-time, 309 (16.9%) were part-time, and 48 (2.6%) were unemployed.

Education

Notes

External links
 Laingholm School website
 Photographs of Laingholm held in Auckland Libraries' heritage collections.

Suburbs of Auckland
Waitākere Ranges Local Board Area
Waitākere Ranges
Populated places around the Manukau Harbour
West Auckland, New Zealand